Ananain (stem bromelain, fruit bromelain) is an enzyme. This enzyme catalyses the following chemical reaction

 Hydrolysis of proteins with broad specificity for peptide bonds. Best reported small molecule substrate Bz-Phe-Val-Arg-NHMec

This enzyme is isolated from stem of pineapple plant, Ananas comosus.

References

External links 
 

EC 3.4.22